The Mid-Atlantic is a region of the United States generally located in the overlap between the Northeastern and Southeastern states. Its exact definition differs upon source, but the region typically includes seven states: Delaware, Maryland, New Jersey, New York, Pennsylvania, Virginia, West Virginia, and Washington, D.C., the nation's capital.

The Mid-Atlantic region of the U.S. played a vital and historic role in the nation's founding and the development of American culture, commerce, trade, and industry sectors; in the late 19th century, the Mid-Atlantic was called "the typically American" region by historian Frederick Jackson Turner. 

The Mid-Atlantic region was settled during the colonial era between the early 17th century and the conclusion of the American Revolutionary War in 1783, by European Americans of primarily Dutch, German, Swedish, English, and other Western European ethnicities. Religious pluralism existed in the original Thirteen Colonies and was particularly prevalent in Pennsylvania and the geographic region that ultimately broke from Pennsylvania to form Delaware. Maryland was the only colony of the original 13 with a substantial Catholic population. 

Following the American Revolution, the Mid-Atlantic region hosted each of the historic capitals of the United States. The nation's capital was constructed in Washington, D.C. and relocated there from Philadelphia following its completion in 1800. In the early part of the 19th century, New York and Pennsylvania overtook Virginia as the most populous states and the New England states as the country's most important trading and industrial centers. Large numbers of German, Irish, Italian, Jewish, Polish, and other immigrants transformed the region, especially coastal cities such as New York City, Newark, Philadelphia, and Baltimore, but also interior cities such as Pittsburgh, Rochester, Albany, and Buffalo. New York, with its skyscrapers, subways, and the Headquarters of the United Nations, emerged in the 20th century as an icon of modernity and American economic and cultural power. By the 21st century, the coastal areas of the Mid-Atlantic were thoroughly urbanized.

The Northeast Corridor and Interstate 95 link an almost contiguous sprawl of suburbs and large and small cities, forming the Mid-Atlantic portion of the Northeast megalopolis, one of the world's most important concentrations of finance, media, communications, education, medicine, and technology. The Mid-Atlantic is a relatively affluent region of the nation, having 43 of the 100 highest-income counties in the nation, based on median household income, and 33 of the top 100, based on per capita income. Most of the Mid-Atlantic states rank among the 15 highest-income states in the nation, by median household income and per capita income. The region is home to some of the most prestigious universities in the nation and the world, including Columbia University, Cornell University, Johns Hopkins University, Princeton University, Georgetown University, and the University of Pennsylvania, each of which rank among the top 20 universities in the U.S. and the top 25 universities in the world.

Composition
There are differing interpretations as to the composition of the Mid-Atlantic, with sources including in the region a number of states from New York to South Carolina. A United States Geological Survey publication describes the Mid-Atlantic Region as all of Maryland, Delaware, the District of Columbia, Pennsylvania, and Virginia, along with the parts of New Jersey, New York, and North Carolina that drain into the Delaware and Chesapeake Bays and the Albemarle and Pamlico Sounds. Sometimes, the region's nucleus is considered to be the area centered on the Washington metropolitan area, including Maryland, Delaware, Virginia, and West Virginia. In contrast to other definitions (where the Mid-Atlantic overlaps the Northeast and Southeast), the United States Census Bureau defines the Middle Atlantic as a subregion of the Northeast consisting exclusively of New York, New Jersey, and Pennsylvania.

West Virginia and Virginia are atypical of this region in a few ways. They are the only states to lie primarily within the Southern American dialect region, and the major religious tradition in both states is Evangelical Christian, 30% in Virginia and 39% in West Virginia. Although a few of West Virginia's eastern panhandle counties are considered part of the Washington metropolitan area, the major portion of the state is rural and there are no major or even large cities.

History

Shipping and trade have been important to the Mid-Atlantic economy since the beginning of the colonial era. The explorer Giovanni da Verrazzano was the first European to see the region in 1524. Henry Hudson later extensively explored that region in 1611 and claimed it for the Dutch, who then created a fur-trading post in Albany in 1614. Jamestown, Virginia was the first permanent English colony in North America, it was established seven years earlier in 1607.

From early colonial times, the Mid-Atlantic region was settled by a wider range of European people than in New England or the South. The Dutch New Netherland settlement along the Hudson River in New York City and New Jersey, and for a time, New Sweden along the Delaware River in Delaware, divided the two great bulwarks of English settlement from each other. The original English settlements in the region notably provided refuge to religious minorities, Maryland to Roman Catholics and Pennsylvania to Quakers and Anabaptist Pennsylvania Dutch. In time, all these settlements fell under English colonial control, but the region continued to be a magnet for people of diverse nationalities.

The area that came to be known as the Middle Colonies served as a strategic bridge between the North and South. The New York and New Jersey campaign during the American Revolutionary War saw more battles than any other theater of the conflict. Philadelphia, midway between the northern and southern colonies, was home to the Continental Congress, the convention of delegates who organized the American Revolution. The same city was the birthplace of the Declaration of Independence in 1776 and the United States Constitution in 1787, while the United States Bill of Rights was drafted and ratified and the first Supreme Court of the United States sat for the first time, in the first capital under the Constitution at New York.

While early settlers were mostly farmers, traders, and fishermen, the Mid-Atlantic states provided the young United States with heavy industry and served as the "melting pot" of new immigrants from Europe. Cities grew along major ports, shipping routes, and waterways, including New York City and Newark on opposite sides of the Hudson River, Philadelphia on the Delaware River, Allentown on the Lehigh River, and Baltimore on the Chesapeake Bay.

Major cities and urban areas

Metropolitan areas

State capitals

Note: The Mid-Atlantic region is also home to the nation's capital, Washington, D.C.

In presidential elections

 Bold denotes election winner.

Culture

Sports

The Mid-Atlantic is home to 33 professional sports franchises in the five major leagues and the two most prominent women's professional leagues:

Notable golf tournaments in the Mid-Atlantic include the Barclays, Quicken Loans National and Atlantic City LPGA Classic. 

Two high-level professional tennis tournaments are held in the region. The US Open, held in New York, is one of the four Grand Slam tennis tournaments, whereas the Washington Open is part of the ATP Tour 500 series and WTA 250 series.

Notable motorsports tracks include Watkins Glen International, Dover Motor Speedway and Pocono Raceway, which have hosted Formula One, IndyCar, NASCAR, World Sportscar Championship and IMSA races. Also, the Englishtown and Reading drag strips such have hosted NHRA national events. Pimlico Race Course at Baltimore and Belmont Park at New York host the Preakness Stakes and Belmont Stakes horse races, which are part of the Triple Crown of Thoroughbred Racing.

Economy
With a GDP nominal of over $5.2 trillion, the Mid-Atlantic economy would be third largest in the world if calculated separately, only behind the remaining United States and China and nearly $1 trillion larger than next place Japan. This economic prosperity is buoyed by a significant financial services and banking sector, healthcare and chemicals industry, and telecommunications and entertainment conglomerates.

According to the Global Financial Centres Index, the Mid-Atlantic region is home to the leading financial center in the world (New York) at #1, with Washington also present at #15.

Notable companies (over $100 billion market cap) headquartered in the region include:

See also
 List of regions of the United States

References

Bibliography
 Bodle, Wayne, "The Mid-Atlantic and the American Revolution", Pennsylvania History 82 (Summer 2015), 282–99.
 Heineman, Kenneth J., "The Only Things You Will Find in the Middle of the Road are Double Yellow Lines, Dead Frogs, and Electoral Leverage: Mid-Atlantic Political Culture and Influence across the Centuries", Pennsylvania History, 82 (Summer 2015), 300–13.
 Landsman, Ned C. Crossroads of Empire: The Middle Colonies in British North America (2010)
 Longhurst, James. Typically American': Trends in the History of Environmental Politics and Policy in the Mid-Atlantic Region". Pennsylvania History: A Journal of Mid-Atlantic Studies 79.4 (2012): 409–427.
 Magoc, Chris J., "In Search of a Useable—and Hopeful—Environmental Narrative in the Mid-Atlantic", Pennsylvania History, 82 (Summer 2015), 314–28.
 Mancall, Peter C., Joshua L. Rosenbloom, and Thomas Weiss. "Exports from the Colonies and States of the Middle Atlantic Region 1720–1800". Research in Economic History 29 (2013): 257–305.
 Marzec, Robert. The Mid-Atlantic Region: The Greenwood Encyclopedia of American Regional Cultures (2004)
 Richter, Daniel K, "Mid-Atlantic Colonies, R.I.P.", Pennsylvania History, 82 (Summer 2015), 257–81.
 Rosenbloom, Joshua L., and Thomas Weiss. "Economic growth in the Mid-Atlantic region: Conjectural estimates for 1720 to 1800". Explorations in Economic History 51 (2014): 41–59.

External links 
 

 
Regions of the United States
Northeastern United States
Eastern United States
Southeastern United States
Census regions of the United States
East Coast of the United States